Ženavlje (Prekmurje Slovene: Ženavle) is a village in the Municipality of Gornji Petrovci in the Prekmurje region of Slovenia.

Ženavlje is known as the unplanned landing site of a stratospheric balloon with the Belgian pioneering balloonist Max Cosyns and his student Nérée van der Elst on 18 August 1934. The 18th of August was declared a municipal holiday and in 1997 a large bronze monument in the shape of a balloon was erected on the spot of the crash landing to commemorate the event.

References

External links
Ženavlje on Geopedia

Populated places in the Municipality of Gornji Petrovci